Athrips tcharyna is a moth of the family Gelechiidae. It is found in south-eastern Kazakhstan.

The wingspan is about 15 mm. The forewings are cream with numerous black scales distributed mainly along the veins and with six indistinct tufts of yellowish white raised scales along the central axis of wing. The hindwings are light grey.

References

Moths described in 2005
Athrips
Moths of Asia